John Donnelly Sheridan (died 5 April 1963) was an Irish politician. He was an independent member of Seanad Éireann from 1954 to 1960. He was first elected to the 8th Seanad in 1954 by the Agricultural Panel. He was re-elected at the 1957 and 1961 Seanad elections. He died in office in 1963, and Batt Donegan was elected to fill the vacancy.

References

Year of birth missing
1963 deaths
Irish farmers
Members of the 8th Seanad
Members of the 9th Seanad
Members of the 10th Seanad
Independent members of Seanad Éireann